The Zotye Domy X5 (Damai X5) was a compact crossover (CUV) manufactured by Chinese automaker Zotye Auto under the Domy (大迈) product series.

Overview

Revealed during the 2015 Shanghai Auto Show in China, the production version of the Zotye Domy X5 was launched later in September 2015 with prices ranging from 58,900 yuan to 111,800 yuan. Styling is controversial as the Domy X5 slightly resembles the Volkswagen Tiguan.

See also
 Volkswagen Tiguan the car that inspired the design of the Domy X5

References

External links

 Zotye Chinese site

Cars of China
Domy X5
Front-wheel-drive vehicles
Cars introduced in 2015
Crossover sport utility vehicles